The 2021 WISE Power 200 was the 7th stock car race of the 2021 NASCAR Camping World Truck Series season and the 21st iteration of the event. The race was held on Saturday, May 1, 2021 in Kansas City, Kansas at Kansas Speedway. The race was extended from 134 laps to 140 due to a NASCAR overtime finish. Kyle Busch, driving for his own team Kyle Busch Motorsports would score his 61st win in the series. Ross Chastain of Niece Motorsports and Austin Hill of Hattori Racing Enterprises would fill in the rest of the podium positions, scoring 2nd and 3rd, respectively.

Background 

Kansas Speedway is a 1.5-mile (2.4 km) tri-oval race track in Kansas City, Kansas. It was built in 2001 and hosts two annual NASCAR race weekends. The NTT IndyCar Series also raced there until 2011. The speedway is owned and operated by the International Speedway Corporation.

Entry list

Qualifying 
Qualifying was determined by a metric qualifying system based on the last race, the 2021 ToyotaCare 250 and owner's points. As a result, John Hunter Nemechek of Kyle Busch Motorsports won the pole.

Race results 
Stage 1 Laps: 30

Stage 2 Laps: 30

Stage 3 Laps: 80

References 

2021 NASCAR Camping World Truck Series
NASCAR races at Kansas Speedway
WISE Power 200
WISE Power 200